Brian Tevreden (born 26 November 1981) is a Dutch former professional footballer who now works as a chief executive at Belgian side K.S.V. Roeselare.

Playing career
Tevreden began his career with FC Volendam and he spent two seasons with the club, appearing in 15 Eredivisie matches. He joined Eerste divisie club FC Emmen in July 2004 after playing against Mansfield Town for Leeds United. In late 2006, Tevreden moved to Greece where he would play for Panthrakikos F.C. in the Beta Ethniki and Fostiras F.C. in the Gamma Ethniki. He returned to the Netherlands to play for FC Dordrecht in the 2008–09 Eerste divisie season.

After retirement
After retiring from professional football Tevreden joined Ajax in 2011 as a coach working within the club's youth system.

In February 2016 Tevreden left Ajax to join English club Reading where he was appointed Head of International Football and Development. When Director of Football at Reading Nick Hammond left the club to join West Brom in April 2016, Tevreden was promoted to take up the role of Director of Football. In September 2018, he left the club and became chief executive at Belgian side K.S.V. Roeselare.

References

External links
 

1981 births
Living people
Association football defenders
Dutch footballers
Footballers from Amsterdam
FC Volendam players
FC Emmen players
FC Dordrecht players
Panthrakikos F.C. players
Eredivisie players
Eerste Divisie players
AFC Ajax non-playing staff